Ann-Marie Gyllenspetz (7 November 1932 – 10 February 1999) was a Swedish actress. She appeared in more than 30 films and television shows between 1953 and 1988. She starred in the 1968 film Who Saw Him Die?, which won the Golden Bear at the 18th Berlin International Film Festival.

Selected filmography

 No Man's Woman (1953) - Imber Ersson
 Dance in the Smoke (1954) - Woman in haystack (uncredited)
 Simon the Sinner (1954) - Rut Persson
 The Yellow Squadron (1954) - Sonja
 Uncle's (1955) - Viveka Svensson
 The Light from Lund (1955) - Anna
 The Hard Game (1956) - Margit Söderberg
 The Song of the Scarlet Flower (1956) - Annika
 Encounters in the Twilight (1957) - Barbro
 Far till sol och vår (1957) - Vera Boman
 Som man bäddar... (1957) - Elisabeth Kallander
 The Minister of Uddarbo (1957) - Hanna
 Brink of Life (1958) - Counsellor Gran
 We at Väddö (1958) - Ylva Markner
 Laila (1958) - Inger Lind
 A Lion in Town (1959) - Greta Berg
 Love 65 (1965) - Ann-Mari 
 Who Saw Him Die? (1968) - Anne-Marie
 Grisjakten (1970) - Margareta Siljeberg
 Hempas bar (1977) - Gunnel

References

External links

1932 births
1999 deaths
Swedish film actresses
People from Gothenburg
20th-century Swedish actresses